Banasandra is a small town north of Turuvekere, India. It plays a vital part for commerce in Turuvekere region acting as a junction of roads and railway systems. It has a railroad track operated by Indian Railways.

Commerce

Since the early 1950s, Banasandra has been the home of mineral and ore transportation companies. Manganese ore was transported here from northern part of Chikkanayakanahally and exported to different parts of the world after quality assessment was done.

Education

Banasandra serves as an education center for surrounding villages. It is the home of VSS High School and VSS Junior College. VSS High School was started as Cooperative Society in the 1960s, and is now part of Government Aided High School. It still continues to operate as a Cooperative Society. High School celebrated its 50th anniversary in 2009.

References

Villages in Tumkur district